The 2020 South Florida Bulls football team represented the University of South Florida (USF) during the 2020 NCAA Division I FBS football season. The Bulls were led by first-year head coach Jeff Scott and played their home games at Raymond James Stadium in Tampa, Florida. They competed as members of the American Athletic Conference.

Previous season

The Bulls finished the 2019 season 4–8, 2–6 in AAC play to finish in fourth place in the East Division. Head coach Charlie Strong was fired December 2, compiling a 21–16 record during his tenure. On December 9, 2019, the university announced the hiring of Clemson co-offensive coordinator and Broyles Award finalist Jeff Scott.

Schedule
The 2020 South Florida Schedule was initially released on February 24, 2020.

The Bulls had games scheduled against Texas, Bethune–Cookman. and Nevada all canceled due to the COVID-19 pandemic.

Source:

Personnel

Staff

Game summaries

The Citadel

at Notre Dame

at Cincinnati

East Carolina

at Temple

Tulsa

at Memphis

at Houston

UCF

Rankings

References

South Florida
South Florida Bulls football seasons
South Florida Bulls football